The sawback poacher (Sarritor frenatus) is a species of fish in the family Agonidae. It was described by Charles Henry Gilbert in 1896, originally under the genus Odontopyxis. It is a marine, temperate water-dwelling fish which is known from the northern Pacific Ocean, including Japan, the Gulf of Anadyr, the Bering Sea, the Aleutian chain, and British Columbia, Canada.

The sawback poacher is preyed on by bony fish including the Pacific cod, the Kamchatka flounder, the Pacific halibut, the Aleutian skate, and Careproctus cyclocephalus. Its own diet consists of fish, fish eggs, fish offal, amphipods, euphausiids, isopods, shrimp, and polychaetes.

References

Sawback poacher
Fish described in 1896